The Voglajna is a river in Styria, Slovenia. Its source is Lake Slivnica near Slivnica pri Celju. It passes Šentjur, the ruins of Rifnik Castle, and Štore, and then merges with the Savinja River in Celje.

See also 
List of rivers of Slovenia

References

External links
 Condition of Voglajna - graphs, in the following order, of water level, flow and temperature data for the past 30 days (taken in Črnolica by ARSO)

Rivers of Styria (Slovenia)
Rivers of Celje